MTI may refer to:

Government and military
 Mastering the Internet, a mass surveillance project led by the British intelligence agency GCHQ
 Military training instructor, the United States Air Force equivalent of a drill instructor

Technology
 Message Type Indicator, in ISO 8583
 Moving target indication, a radar signal processing technique used to distinguish targets from clutter

Organizations
 MTI Consulting, a consulting firm based in Bahrain
 Magyar Távirati Iroda, a Hungarian news wire agency
 Ministry of Trade and Industry (Singapore), a ministry of the Government of Singapore
 Mitchell Technical Institute, a community college in South Dakota, US
 Music Theatre International, a musical theater licensing company
 Midwest Technical Institute, a vocational school in Springfield, Illinois, US
 MTI Home Video, a film distributor

Other uses
 Master of Translation and Interpreting, a master's degree
 Mother tongue influence, a form of language interference
 Movie tie-in (book) edition of a book is often indicated by "(MTI)" after its title
 Muppet Treasure Island, a 1996 Muppet film